Çağrı Kodalak (born 12 January 1991) is a Dutch-born Turkish football player who most recently played for Rijnsburgse Boys in the Tweede Divisie.

Club career
He made his professional debut in the Eredivisie for SBV Vitesse on 18 April 2010 in a game against Roda JC Kerkrade.

References

External links
 

1991 births
Dutch people of Turkish descent
Footballers from The Hague
Living people
Turkish footballers
Dutch footballers
Dutch expatriate footballers
Feyenoord players
ADO Den Haag players
FC Dordrecht players
Birmingham City F.C. players
Göztepe S.K. footballers
SBV Vitesse players
Sarıyer S.K. footballers
FC Den Bosch players
SC Telstar players
Rijnsburgse Boys players
Eerste Divisie players
Tweede Divisie players
Eredivisie players
Association football midfielders
Dutch expatriate sportspeople in England
Expatriate footballers in England